Mount Lampert is a mountain about  west of Kelsey Cliff in the southeast part of the Guettard Range, in Palmer Land, Antarctica. It was mapped by the United States Geological Survey from surveys and U.S. Navy air photos, 1961–67, and was named by the Advisory Committee on Antarctic Names for Irwin Ronald Lampert, a storekeeper at South Pole Station in 1964.

References

Mountains of Palmer Land